Klokova (also known as Paliovouna (Παλιοβούνα)) is a mountain in the southeast of Aetolia-Acarnania, in western Greece. In classical antiquity, the mountain was known as Taphiassus (Ταφιασσός). Its highest point is 1,039 m.

Geography
The mountain is located nearly 6 km west of Antirrio and sits on the northeast shore of the Gulf of Patras. A nearby mountain range is Arakynthos to the northwest, separated from Klokova by the river Evinos.

The National Road 5 runs along the southern foot of the mountain. This was once used for main traffic between Antirrio and Messolonghi as well as Ioannina, the traffic now carried by the Ionia Odos (part of the E55) running in the southern portion underneath with the Klokova Tunnel, which is 2.8 km long and was opened to traffic on 12 April 2017.

Mythology
According to Greek mythology, Nessus and other centaurs were buried on the hill of Taphiassus. Nessus tried to carry Deianeira across the Evinos river, which led Hercules to kill him. The decomposition of their bodies made water flowing at the foot of the hill to be ""bleak and with blood clots...".

References

External links
Climbing Paliovouna 

Mountains of Greece
Landforms of Aetolia-Acarnania
Nafpaktia